Théodore Nouwens (17 February 1908 – 21 December 1974) was a Belgian international footballer who participated at the 1930 FIFA World Cup.

References

 

1908 births
1974 deaths
Belgian footballers
Belgium international footballers
1930 FIFA World Cup players
Sportspeople from Mechelen
Footballers from Antwerp Province
Association football defenders